Eman is a Tivoid language of Cameroon. The rather divergent dialects are Eman proper and Amanavil.

References

Languages of Cameroon
Tivoid languages